Mulangunnathukavu railway station (station code: MGK) is in Mulakunnathukavu (മുളങ്കുന്നത്തുകാവ്), a panchayat in Puzhakkal block of Thrissur, which is situated between Wadakkanchery railway station and Punkunnam railway station in the busy Shoranur–Cochin Harbour section. Mulangunnathukavu railway station is operated by the Chennai-headquartered Southern Railways of the Indian Railways. Ticketing is computerized and there are also basic parking facilities on site. A Food Corporation of India storage facility is located close nearby.

Only passenger trains and MEMU trains stop here. The line presently connects only trains through the cities of Ernakulam, Kozhikode, Palakkad, Shornur, Tirur (Malappuram), Thalassery, Kannur and Coimbatore.

See also
Ollur railway station
Punkunnam railway station
Chalakudi railway station
Guruvayur railway station
Wadakkanchery railway station
Thrissur Railway Passengers’ Association

References

External links

Thiruvananthapuram railway division
Railway stations in Thrissur